Abednego Kofi Tetteh (born 9 October 1990) is a Ghanaian footballer who last played as a forward for Accra Hearts of Oak.

Career 
Tetteh had his breakout season with Bechem United in 2016, during the 2016 Ghana Premier League season, which he played 24 league matches, scored 13 goals and made 5 assists. He also won the Ghanaian FA Cup in 2016 after the team scored his former club Okwawu United in the final by 3–1 through a brace from Yaw Annor. He secured a move to Sudanese club Al-Hilal Club in late 2016. He won the Sudan Premier League during the 2017 season whilst playing with them. He subsequently had spells in Ethiopia with Jimma Aba Buna and back again in Sudan with Al-Hilal El-Obeid. After his spells in Sudan and Ethiopia, he moved to India and joined Real Kashmir and later TRAU.

In May 2020, Tetteh joined Ghana Premier League side Accra Hearts of Oak on a free transfer, signing a three-year deal with the club. He made his debut 29 November 2020, in a 1–0 loss to International Allies. He started the match played 45 minutes before being substituted at halt time for Eric Dizan. Tetteh won the double with Hearts in his debut season with the club, however he played a role as back up forward to Kwadwo Obeng Junior, Victor Aidoo and Isaac Mensah as he was limited to 5 league matches and 2 appearances in the Ghanaian FA Cup as Hearts beat Ashanti Gold in the final via a penalty shootout. The win made it his second time of winning the competition after winning with Bechem in 2016.

On 18 August 2021, his contract with the club was mutually terminated after a 15 months stay with the club.

Career statistics

Club

Notes

Honours 

Bechem United
 Ghanaian FA Cup: 2016

Al-Hilal Club
 Sudan Premier League: 2017

Hearts of Oak
 Ghana Premier League: 2020–21
Ghanaian FA Cup: 2021

References

External links 

 

1990 births
Living people
Ghanaian footballers
Ghanaian expatriate footballers
Association football forwards
Ghana Premier League players
Bechem United FC players
Al-Hilal Club (Omdurman) players
I-League players
Expatriate footballers in Sudan
Ghanaian expatriate sportspeople in Sudan
Expatriate footballers in Ethiopia
Ghanaian expatriate sportspeople in Ethiopia
Expatriate footballers in India
Ghanaian expatriate sportspeople in India
Real Kashmir FC players
El Hilal SC El Obeid players